IWS may refer to:
 West Houston Airport (IATA code)
 Individually wrapped slices, in reference to processed cheese
 Integrated Workstation, developed by Convergent Technologies (Unisys)
 International Wool Secretariat
 International Wrestling Syndicate
 In-water survey, a method of surveying the underwater parts of a floating ship
 Irish Water Spaniel
 Steyr IWS 2000, an Austrian semi-automatic rifle